"You Know How to Love Me" is a song by Reggie Lucas and James Mtume, most notably recorded by Phyllis Hyman and released on Hyman's fourth studio album of the same name, released in 1979.

Chart performance
The single, released in the disco era, was one of Phyllis Hyman's most successful releases.  "You Know How to Love Me" peaked at number six on the disco chart, becoming her biggest hit on that chart.  While the single did not place on the Hot 100, it peaked at number twelve on the Hot Soul Singles chart.

Personnel
Phyllis Hyman - lead and backing vocals
James Mtume - keyboards, percussion, backing vocals
Reggie Lucas - guitar, backing vocals
Howard King - drums
Ed "Tree" Moore - guitar
Basil Fearington - bass
Harry Whitaker, Hubert Eaves - keyboards
Ed Walsh - Synthesizer
Gwen Guthrie, Syndi Jordan, Tawatha - backing vocals
Wade Marcus - string and horn arrangements

References 

1979 singles
Songs written by Reggie Lucas
1979 songs
Songs written by James Mtume
Phyllis Hyman songs
Lisa Stansfield songs
Robin S. songs